Choi Tae-uk (Hanja: 崔兌旭; born 13 March 1981) is a South Korean football coach and former player who is assistant coach of South Korea.

Club career 
Choi is a natural winger well known for his great speed. He was identified as a very promising talent in his childhood, and was selected by Anyang LG Cheetahs in the 2000 draft following his graduation from Bupyeong High School. Despite his early promise, his professional career at Anyang was particularly successful, playing as a wing-back together with then-teammate Lee Young-pyo.

After short spells playing for Incheon United and J1 League side Shimizu S-Pulse, Choi joined Pohang Steelers. Although one of the better paid players at Pohang, Choi was not given much of a chance under Brazilian coach Sergio Farias. This was largely because the Steelers concentrated on midfield play rather than the sidelines, with playmaker Andrezinho (known as Tavares in South Korea) playing a significant role. Choi was usually fielded as a substitute. Following the conclusion of the 2007 season, he transferred to Jeonbuk Hyundai Motors.

Choi retired from football in 2015 due to an injury.

International career 
At international level, Choi was part of the South Korean Olympic football team in 2004. At the Olympics, South Korea finished second in Group A, making it through to the next round, but was defeated by eventual silver medal winners Paraguay.

Choi was also a member of the South Korean World Cup team in 2002, but spent most of the tournament on the bench.

Career statistics

Club

International

Results list South Korea's goal tally first.

Honours
FC Seoul
K League 1: 2000, 2010, 2012
Korean FA Cup: 2002, 2009, 2010
Korean League Cup: 2010
Korean Super Cup: 2001
AFC Champions League runner-up: 2001–02, 2013

Shimizu S-Pulse
Emperor's Cup runner-up: 2005

Pohang Steelers
K League 1: 2007
Korean FA Cup runner-up: 2007

Jeonbuk Hyundai Motors
K League 1: 2009

South Korea U23
Asian Games bronze medal: 2002

South Korea
FIFA World Cup fourth place: 2002

Individual
K League 1 Best XI: 2009

Notes

References

External links
 
 Choi Tae-uk at KFA 
 
 
 
 
 

1981 births
Living people
Association football wingers
South Korean footballers
South Korean expatriate footballers
South Korea international footballers
FC Seoul players
Incheon United FC players
Ulsan Hyundai FC players
Shimizu S-Pulse players
Pohang Steelers players
Jeonbuk Hyundai Motors players
K League 1 players
J1 League players
Expatriate footballers in Japan
2002 FIFA World Cup players
Footballers at the 2000 Summer Olympics
Footballers at the 2004 Summer Olympics
Olympic footballers of South Korea
Sportspeople from Incheon
South Korean expatriate sportspeople in Japan
Asian Games medalists in football
Footballers at the 2002 Asian Games
Asian Games bronze medalists for South Korea
Medalists at the 2002 Asian Games